Al-Hadbaa Sport Club, is an Iraqi football team based in Nineveh, that plays in Iraq Division Two.

History

Club building bombing
After ISIS took control of Mosul in 2014, they blew up the club's building, and after liberation in 2017 it was rebuilt, and the building opened in November 2019.

in Division Three
Al-Hadbaa played in the Iraq Division Three in the 2021–22 season and topped its group, and qualified for the final, but lost the championship title in the final match against Kafaat Nineveh SC by penalty kicks, and the two teams promoted together to the Iraq Division Two.

In Division Two
Al-Hadbaa played in Iraq Division Two in the 2022–23 season and passed the First Stage as a representative of Nineveh with Baladiyat Al-Mosul, and qualified for the Second Stage to play in the Northern Group.

Other games
Al-Hadbaa is a multi-sports club, and some of its teams have won championships, such as the karate and cycling teams.

Managerial history
 Faris Idris

See also 
 2022–23 Iraq FA Cup

References

External links
 Al-Hadbaa SC on Goalzz.com
 Iraq Clubs- Foundation Dates

2004 establishments in Iraq
Association football clubs established in 2004
Football clubs in Nineveh